Power Horse Stadium is a multi-purpose stadium in Almería, Spain. It is the home ground of UD Almería, and holds 15,274 people.

History
Inaugurated on 31 July 2004 and originally built for the 2005 Mediterranean Games, the stadium cost around €21 million, which was paid by the Ayuntamiento de Almería. It subsequently became UD Almería's home stadium, replacing Estadio Municipal Juan Rojas, with the latter being used by the reserve team.

The stadium was expanded from 15,000 to 21,350 after Almería's promotion to La Liga. Since 2012, the club uses extra seats behind the goals for avoiding the use of the part of the stadium which is the furthest of the pitch. With this configuration, the capacity is reduced to 15,274.
In August 2021, the Ayuntamiento de Almería agreed to grant the operation of the stadium to UD Almería for a 25-year period.

Access
Located two kilometers near the main railway station of the city and a little further of the centre, the stadium can be accessed through the station or through the bus Line 7, in spite of car access.

Spain national team matches
On 9 February 2005, it hosted Spain's 5–0 win over San Marino in qualification for the 2006 FIFA World Cup.

Gallery

Panorama

References

External links
Patronato Municipal de Deportes de Almería profile  
Estadios de España profile

Football venues in Andalusia
UD Almería
Athletics (track and field) venues in Spain
Multi-purpose stadiums in Spain
Sports venues in Andalusia
Sports venues completed in 2004
Buildings and structures in Almería